The Belonging Co is a contemporary worship music band founded by Henry Seeley, originating from The Belonging Co church in Nashville, Tennessee. The collective has released five live albums, All the Earth (2017), Awe + Wonder (2019), See the Light (2021), Here (2022) and Now (2022).

History
The Belonging Co made its debut in 2017, released their first live album, All the Earth, on September 8, 2017. The album debuted on Billboard'''s Top Christian Albums Chart at number two, having sold 3,000 equivalent album units in its first week of sales. The promotional single, "Peace Be Still" featuring Lauren Daigle, debuted at number 35 on the US Hot Christian Songs, and spent a total of five weeks on the chart.

On March 23, 2018, The Belonging Co released "Isn't He (This Jesus)" featuring Natalie Grant, as their first career single. The song debuted at number 27 on the US Hot Christian Songs chart, and spent two weeks on the chart. On September 9, 2019, The Belonging Co released "Hosanna" featuring Kari Jobe as the first promotional single from their second live album, Awe + Wonder, slated for release on September 13. Awe + Wonder was released on September 13, 2019. The album debuted at number 38 on the Top Christian Albums Chart.

On March 27, 2020, The Belonging Co released "Holy (Song of the Ages)" featuring Andrew Holt, as a single. On February 5, 2021, The Belonging Co released "Every Victory" featuring Danny Gokey as a single. "Every Victory" peaked at number 29 on the US Hot Christian Songs Chart. On March 5, 2021, The Belonging Co released "Turn Your Eyes" featuring Natalie Grant as a single. On April 2, 2021, The Belonging Co released "The Truth" featuring Lauren Strahm and Andrew Holt as a single. On May 7, 2021, The Belonging Co released "War Cry" featuring Henry Seeley as the first promotional single from See the Light, their third live album was slated for release on May 21. On May 14, 2021, The Belonging Co released "Eyes on You" featuring Sarah Reeves as the second promotional single from See the Light. See the Light'' was released on May 21, 2021.

Members
The members of The Belonging Co include:
 Cody Carnes
 Kari Jobe
 Natalie Grant
 Mia Fieldes
 Meredith Andrews
 Andrew Holt
 Hope Darst
 Daniella Mason
 Maggie Reed
 Lauren Strahm
 Sarah Reeves
 Henry Seeley

Discography

Live albums

Singles

Promotional singles

See also
 List of Christian worship music artists

References

External links
 

Musical groups established in 2017
Musical groups from Nashville, Tennessee
American Christian musical groups
Performers of contemporary worship music
2017 establishments in Tennessee